Adrian Reid (born 10 March 1985) is a Jamaican former professional footballer who played as a defender.

Club career
Reid played for Waterhouse Kingston from 2004 to 2005, and then joined Portmore United. In 2008 and 2009 Reid had trials with Vålerenga, Aalesund and Lillestrøm in Norway. In August 2009 it was announced that Lillestrøm signed Reid on loan for the rest of the autumn. He returned to Portmore United in January 2010.

On 17 March 2011, he signed a loan agreement with Vålerenga, the club he played a training match with against Liverpool in 2008. He returned to Portmore United in summer 2011.

International career
Reid played for the Jamaican U20 national team from 2004 to 2005 and the U23 squad from 2005 to 2007. He made 34 appearances for the Jamaica senior national team.

References

1985 births
Living people
Jamaican footballers
Association football defenders
Jamaica international footballers
2011 CONCACAF Gold Cup players
National Premier League players
TT Pro League players
Waterhouse F.C. players
Portmore United F.C. players
Lillestrøm SK players
Vålerenga Fotball players
San Juan Jabloteh F.C. players
Jamaican expatriate footballers
Jamaican expatriate sportspeople in Norway
Expatriate footballers in Norway
Jamaican expatriate sportspeople in Trinidad and Tobago
Expatriate footballers in Trinidad and Tobago